Adel Hammoude (born 8 March 1960) is a Syrian boxer. He competed in the men's light flyweight event at the 1980 Summer Olympics.

References

1960 births
Living people
Syrian male boxers
Olympic boxers of Syria
Boxers at the 1980 Summer Olympics
Place of birth missing (living people)
Light-flyweight boxers